Holme Pierrepont Country Park, home of The National Water Sports Centre is located in the hamlet of Holme Pierrepont near Nottingham, England and on the River Trent. It is used for many different types of sports and has recently received significant investment which has enabled a major refurbishment of existing facilities as well as introduction of new facilities.

Run by Serco on behalf of Nottinghamshire County Council, it was previously one of five National Sports Centres, and is a unique sporting venue set in the centre of the country.

History
The centre was constructed during 1970 and 1971 on a former gravel works and required the excavation of one and a half million cubic yards of material. The centre opened in 1971 and won second prize in the 1972 Times/RICS Conservation Awards and was consequently chosen to host the first National Rowing Championships in 1972.

Until 2009 the centre was operated on behalf of Sport England however control was returned to Nottinghamshire County Council due to priority changes around the 2012 Summer Olympics. In 2013 a new management team from Serco Leisure was put in place, on a 21 year contract with an obligation to maintain and upgrade the site's facilities.

Facilities 
The centre is made up of three distinct pieces of water:

 Regatta lake, a 2,000 metre regatta rowing facility which features either a six lane rowing course or a 9 lane Sprint Kayak course
 A 700 m purpose-built white water canoe slalom course
 A open water swimming and Canoe polo lagoon. This used to be the site of a wakeboard cabletow, however this suffered neglect and eventually collapsed into the lake and was removed.

Further, the River Trent is also accessible from the site.

Outdoor Adventure Park 
Holme Pierrepont Country Park also has an Outdoor Adventure Park, formerly known as the Family Fun Park, located in the Country Park area of the site. Opened in 2014, which includes:

 Sky Trail High Ropes Course
 Mini Golf
 Climbing Wall
 Children's Play Area
 Country Park Café

Skytrail and Sky Tykes 
The Skytrail is a high ropes course that allows participants to challenge themselves to cross a multitude of obstacles on two levels without needing to be detached at any point. Sky Tykes is a miniature version for smaller children.

Mini golf  
Beneath the Skytrail sits a 9- hole mini golf course that increases in difficulty with each hole.

Climbing wall 
A 10-metre climbing wall with four sides offers both a challenge to climbers of all abilities and a phenomenal view of the river.

Gym 
There are two new gyms which were opened in 2014 - these include a 60 station Life Fitness gym which overlooks the Regatta Lake and a specific Strength and Conditioning gym. Equipment includes:

 The New Life Fitness Discovery Range
 Resistance Equipment from Life Fitness’ Premium Signature Range
 Power Plate
 Life Fitness – Synrgy360 Functional Training
 Trixter Virtual Training Bikes
 SpeedStroke Kayak Simulator
 Squat Rack
 2 x Olympic Lifting Platforms
 Free Weights
 Benches
 Assisted Chin Dip

Accommodation 

The site has 54 refurbished en-suite bedrooms in the main Lakeside building, as well as a self-contained cottage called The Elms, which sleeps up to 11 people. The site also has an 18-acre campsite containing a mixture of grass and hard standing pitches, some available with electric hook up, 5 Tipi's (introduced in 2016) and 10 Camping Arches (insulated wooden huts for camping in).

Conferencing facilities 
The centre offers conference and meeting facilities and has four refurbished conference rooms, with the largest room catering for up to 150 people.

Holme Pierrepont Country Park also offers team building activities alongside their conferencing packages.

Courses 
The facilities provide a full range of award courses in: canoeing, kayaking, and raft guide training.

A sports science and medicine centre, ran by the English Institute of Sport, is purpose built and is available for use by governing bodies for physiology, sports injury/rehabilitation and physiological testing.

Whitewater course 

The course is a focal point for English whitewater rafting and kayaking, often holding international events for slalom, freestyle and wild water racing.  One hosted event is the National Student Rodeo, the largest freestyle kayaking event in the world. During this event the Centre received coverage in local news, and publications such as Canoe & Kayak UK magazine.

Location 
The whitewater course is located between the weir on the canalised River Trent and the regatta lake.

Construction 
Built in 1986, the course is made primarily from concrete. It is approximately 700 metres long, drops just over 4 metres in height to produce Grade 3 whitewater rapids.  The course is gravity fed, does not use electricity to power it, and therefore is relatively cheap to run.

Due to the nature of the design, swimming through the course is safer than many other locations around the UK due to deep channels and few significant underwater obstructions.

The amount of water flowing through the course depends on rainfall, and canal usage, but due to the large catchment of the Trent, flows between 16 and 25 cubic metres per second are common. As the course is directly connected to the Trent high river levels cause the course to progressively flood from the bottom upwards. The whitewater course is open to the public up to a river level of 2.2m as measured at the Environment Agency Colwick gauging station.

The course was renovated in 2009. Along with essential maintenance work, some of the original concrete obstacles were removed and Omniflots (large plastic movable blocks) were installed.

Sports 

Holme Pierrepont Country Park, home of The National Water Sports Centre, is home of British Canoeing, the national governing body for canoeing and kayaking in the UK, whose headquarters are at the site.

The Holme Pierrepont Canoe Club gives lessons on the flat water lake and the course, which is also used for water safety and water rescue training. It also hosts rafting, playboating, slalom; kayaking plus squirt boaters, open boat canoeists and wild water racing.

One of the main sports held at the centre is rowing, using the 2000 metre multi-lane rowing lake. The Centre was the venue for the World Rowing Junior Championships in 1973, and for the World Rowing Championships in 1975 and 1986, and many major competitions for UK rowing. Typically the safety is outsourced to local lifeguard unit Colwick Park Lifeguards who have been part of the team at Holme Pierrepont since 1979.

The centre is also the venue for many Triathlon events, including the Outlaw Half and Full Triathlons. The full triathlon sees over 1100 athletes from all over the world taking on a 2.4 mile swim, 112 mile bike ride and 26.2 mile run.

The centre is the base for the Holme Pierrepont Running Club.

The centre was chosen to host the Sea Scout 100 national Sea Scout Centenary Jamboree in August 2009. Over 3000 Sea Scouts attended including the USA and New Zealand.

See also 
Other UK artificial whitewater courses
 Lee Valley White Water Centre
 Cardiff International White Water
 Cardington Artificial Slalom Course
 Nene Whitewater Centre
 Teesside White Water Course.

References

External links 

 
 UK Rivers Guide
 Nottingham HPP whitewater course users group.
 Colwick Park Lifeguards.
 Holme Pierrepont Running Club website.
 Holme Pierrepont Country Park Trail

Rowing venues in the United Kingdom
Sports venues in Nottingham
Lakes of Nottinghamshire
Artificial whitewater courses in the United Kingdom
River Trent
Sports academies
Country parks in Nottinghamshire
Water sports in England